Radio Católica may refer to:
WGUA-LP, a low power FM radio station licensed to Lawrence, Massachusetts
KLOC, an AM radio station licensed to Turlock, California
Radio Católica (Nicaragua), a church-owned station shut down by the Sandinistas

See also
:Category:Catholic radio stations